Go Climb a Tree is the thirteenth album by Celtic band Gaelic Storm. It was released on July 28, 2017.

Track listing 
All arrangements by Gaelic Storm.

 "The Beer Song" - 3:23
 "Shanghai Kelley" - 2:46
 "Green, White and Orange" - 4:38
 "Monday Morning Girl" - 3:56
 "The Night of Tomfoolery" - 3:37
 "Shine On" - 4:14
 "Already Home" - 4:12
 "Back to the Pub" - 2:52
 "The Galician Dinky" - 3:56
 "Weeping Willow" - 4:53
 "Damn Near Died in Killaloe" - 4:35
 "Go Climb a Tree" - 3:10

Personnel 
Gaelic Storm
 Patrick Murphy
 Steve Twigger
 Ryan Lacey
 Peter Purvis
 Katie Grennan

References 

Gaelic Storm albums
2017 albums